Mazra'a is an Arab town and local council in northern Israel, situated between Acre and Nahariyya east of the Coastal Highway that runs along the Mediterranean coast. The local council was founded in 1896 and was incorporated into the Matte Asher Regional Council in 1982, before proclaiming itself an independent local council again in 1996.

Etymology
The Arabic al-mazra'a (p. mazari'''), meaning "the sown land" or "farm", is a relatively common place name used to refer to cultivated lands outside of and dependent upon a primary settlement. In Crusader times, the village was known as le Mezera, according to Victor Guérin, while to Arabs in medieval times, it was known as al-Mazra'ah.

History
Mazra'a is mentioned in the 1283 treaty between the Mamluk Sultan Qalaun and the Latin Kingdom of the Crusaders that controlled some territories in the Levant between 1099 and 1291. At the time of the treaty,  Mazra'a was said to be still under Crusaders  control.Khamisy, 2013, p. 94, #33 A 50 metre long wall to the west of the village centre, dating from the period, is thought to be the remnants of a fortified structure, mentioned by travel writers.

Ottoman Empire
Mazra'a was incorporated into the Ottoman Empire in 1517 with all of Palestine and in 1596, the tax registers listed Mazra'a as forming part of the nahiya (subdistrict) of Acca (Acre). The population is recorded as 27 Muslim households, and the villagers paid a fixed tax-rate of 25% on wheat, barley, cotton, in addition to "occasional revenues," goats, beehives, and water buffaloes; a total of 5,352 akçe. 14/24 of the revenue went to a waqf.

In the 1760s, Mazra'a was one of five villages in nahiya ("subdistrict") of Sahil Akka ("Acre coast"), which was under the direct rule of Zahir al-Umar, the independent governor of the Galilee, as one of his Viftlik estates. As such, villagers were exempt from paying the usual Ottoman taxes. (Other Viftlik estates were Judayda, Samiriyya, al-Makr, and Julis.) After the death of Zahir al-Umar in 1775, these villages were abandoned for a time, becoming known as places of lawlessness. Jezzar Pasha, the new governor of Acre, first returned the villages to their local sheiks, later dividing the income collected from them between himself and the local official.

A map by Pierre Jacotin  from Napoleon's invasion of 1799 showed the place, named as El Masar, while  Napoleon Bonaparte himself described El-Mazara as a village of hundreds of Christians.

Victor Guérin, who visited the place in 1875, described Mezra'a as a village with a very small number of inhabitants, sepulchral grottos, cisterns, and a number of houses built of stone. The remains of a small castle fort are dated by him to the Middle Ages, if not earlier. Not far from it lay a number of columns that once ornamented a church. Close to the village was a khan said to have been built by Jezzar Pasha from which an aqueduct traveled through the valley under high arches.

In 1881,  the PEF's Survey of Western Palestine (SWP)   described the place as "A stone and conglomerate village, having 200 Moslems, situated on the plain, with olives, pomegranates, mulberries, and arable land; the aqueduct supplies good water."

A population list from about 1887 showed that  el Mazra'h  had about 185 inhabitants, all Muslim.

 British Mandate 

In the 1922 census of Palestine conducted by the British Mandate authorities Mazra'a''  had a population of 218; all Muslims,  increasing in the  1931 census to a population of 320;  307 Muslims, 5 Christians and 8 Baháʼís, in a total of 78  houses.

In the 1945 statistics the population of Mazra was 430; 410 Muslims, 10 Christians and 10 classified as “others”.
The land area was counted together with those of  Shavei Zion, Ein Sara and Ga'aton  and totalled 7,407  dunams of land according to an official land and population survey. A total of 737 dunams were for citrus and bananas, 1,631 dunams were plantations and irrigable land, 4,033 used for cereals, while 113 dunams were built-up (urban) land.

Israel 
Mazra'a is one of the few Palestinian Arab coastal towns in the Western Galilee to have remained populated after the 1948 Arab–Israeli war. It served as a collection point for villagers expelled from the neighbouring villages of al-Zeeb and al-Bassa, assaulted and depopulated during Operation Ben-Ami beginning on 13 May 1948, two days before the official outbreak of the 1948 Arab-Israeli war. This caused the population to increase from 460 in 1946 to 620 in 1951.

The land area of 312 hectares owned by Mazra'a in 1945 was reduced to 30 hectares in 1962, for reasons that included an expropriation of 155 hectares by the Israeli government in 1953–54.

Notable structures

Vaulted medieval building
The medieval building is located on the east side of the aqueduct, in the old part of the village. The masonry, composed of large (average size 1m x 0.5m) blocks, is consistent with a medieval date. Petersen, who visited the place in 1991 and 1994 and examined it, found two chambers, one long (11.4 x 6.35m) chamber aligned east-west, and one  smaller chamber aligned north-south. Rock-cut troughs found in the smaller room indicated that it might have been a stable.

Khan al Waqif
The building is a square enclosure, located about 800 m. north of the village, and it is associated with the construction of the Kabri aqueduct at the beginning of the nineteenth century. On the NE and the NW corners of the courtyard are staircases leading to the flat roof. The south part of the building consists of a vaulted hall, with an arcade of six arches facing the courtyard.

Khan Evron
This building is located about 1 km north-east of the village, just south of the Kabri aqueduct. The design is very similar to the Khan al Waqif, and it is assumed that they date from the same age.

See also 
Arab localities in Israel
Bahá'í World Centre buildings

References

Bibliography

 

 p. 133-135, Cited in Petersen, 2001.

External links
Mazra'a (Israel)
Welcome To al-Mazra'a
Survey of Western Palestine, Map 3:  IAA, Wikimedia commons 

Arab localities in Israel
Local councils in Northern District (Israel)